Sulkiewicz may refer to the following persons:

Aleksander Sulkiewicz, a politician of Lipka Tatar origin
Maciej Sulkiewicz, a Tsarist general of Lipka Tatar origin